Happy Moment is the first studio album by South Korean girl group WJSN. The album was released digitally and physically on June 7, 2017 by Starship Entertainment and distributed by LOEN Entertainment. It contains ten songs, including the promoted single "Happy". For the first time since debut, there is no Chinese version of the lead single available on this album, this is the first surprise album just after four months after the release of From. WJSN.

Background and release 
On May 18, 2017, a post to the official WJSN Facebook page announced a new comeback set for June 7 would be "coming soon," revealing the names of the lead single and the forthcoming album. Teasers for the album were released starting on May 24 until June 5. On June 7, 2017 at 6PM KST, the music video for "Happy" was released on YouTube and Naver V LIVE and Happy Moment was made available for download on Melon in South Korea and iTunes worldwide. WJSN held a media showcase on the same day, which was also broadcast on V LIVE.

Promotion 

On June 8, WJSN had their first comeback stage on Mnet's M Countdown performing lead single "Happy" and album track "Miracle". This was followed by performances on KBS' Music Bank, MBC's Show! Music Core, SBS' Inkigayo, and MBC Music's Show Champion during their first week of music show promotions.

Commercial performance 
Happy Moment entered and peaked at number 3 on the Gaon Album Chart on the chart issue dated June 4–10, 2017. The album entered at number 9 on the chart for the month of June 2017, with 25,983 physical copies sold. The album has sold over 34,539 physical copies as of July 2017.

Singles 
"Happy" was released as the title track in conjunction with the album. A music video teaser was released on June 1, 2017. The official music video was released on June 7. The song entered at number 77 on the Gaon Digital Chart on the chart issue dated June 4–10, 2017, with 28,636 downloads sold.

Track listing

Release history

References 

Korean-language albums
2017 debut albums
Kakao M albums
Cosmic Girls albums
Starship Entertainment albums